Sharon Byatt (born in Liverpool), is a British actress who has appeared on TV as Irenee in Carla Lane's Bread and Sue Freeman in Springhill, and on stage as both Linda and Mrs. Johnstone in Blood Brothers.

Biography 
Byatt attended St Julie's Catholic High School in Liverpool, and trained at the Chiltern School of Dance and Drama in Croxteth, Liverpool. Her first stage appearance was in 1990 in the musical Blood Brothers in London's West End, playing "a sparky, tomboyish Linda". She reprised the role in regional tours of the show, and has also played the role of Mrs Johnstone in performances of Blood Brothers in York and Malvern. She has also appeared in leading roles in The Tommy Cooper Show in Blackpool and Sheffield, and A Midsummer Night’s Dream and A Taste of Honey in Liverpool. 
She is artistic director of the Chiltern Youth Theatre Company.

Selected stage performances

Selected filmography

References

Year of birth missing (living people)
Living people
British actresses